James Dodd is a South Australian artist, arts educator and street artist who used the pseudonym Dlux for his street art when he operated out of Melbourne.

Biography 
Born in Bordertown in 1977, Dodd has a Bachelor of Visual Art and a Masters of Visual Art from the University of South Australia. Dodd teaches at Adelaide Central School of Art. As a street artist, he used the pseudonym Dlux and was one of a group of street artists who considered legal action against the National Gallery of Australia when it failed to pay them in a timely manner for their works.

Career
He began doing street art in Adelaide in 1998, using stencils to mass-produce stickers. Dodd moved to Melbourne around 2002 because of the street-art scene. As Dlux, Dodd was a powerful presence on the Melbourne streets but also undertook a large amount of gallery work, and his stencils were always very politically motivated. As Dlux, Dodd is also featured in the documentary film Rash (2005), which explores the cultural value of street art in Melbourne.

He was one of the most active street artists in Melbourne but returned to Adelaide to undertake further studies (Masters in Visual Art, University of South Australia. Since then, his practice has expanded to include painting and sculpture, celebrating Australia's culture of rebellion and resistance.

Artistic style and subject 
Dodd’s practice incorporates street art, sculpture, and painting. His street art has been criticised for 'glamourising dangerous youth gangs'. His sculpture and paintings reflect his rural upbringing and he uses objects such as bus shelters, bicycles, and surfboards as a basis for his work. He also constructs objects such as River Cycle ('a bicycle in a tinnie'), and drawing and painting machines.

Collections 
Dodd’s work is held in the following collections:
 University of Queensland Art Museum (search for James Dodd)
 Australia National Maritime Museum
 National Gallery of Australia (under both James Dodd and Dlux)

Further reading 
 Bellamy, Louise. (16 March 2014). Art collectors swap Nolan and Whiteley for street art. The Sydney Morning Herald. 
 Bilske, Maria. (2000-2001). Gleam . Eyeline, Vol. 44, Summer : 46.
 Dodd, James. (2014) Future hardware wildstyle. Artlink, Vol. 34, No. 1, Mar: 40-42.
 Hansen, N. (2006). "Rash": Street Art and Social Dialogue. Metro, (151), 80–83.
 Radok, Stephanie. (2007). Parkside nomadic group moves inland 4 winter; Years without magic; Speakeasy. Artlink, Vol. 27, No. 3, Sep: 95.

See also

 List of Australian artists
 List of people from Adelaide
 List of people from Melbourne
 List of street artists
 Spray paint art
 Types of graffiti

References 

May's Sydney. 1 April 2005. (Featured artist).
Stencil art world draws the line  8 May 2007
National Gallery of Australia entry on DLUX
Norman, James, "Graffiti goes upmarket", The Age, Melbourne, Australia, 16 August 2003. It includes some information on DLUX.

External links 
"Make Stencils Not War" - a work by Dlux
Personal website
Bike powered percussion contraption [video]
Rash, documentary on Australian street artists which features Dodd.

1977 births
20th-century Australian artists
20th-century Australian people
21st-century Australian artists
Artists from South Australia
Australian graffiti artists
Australian contemporary artists
Living people
Artists from Adelaide
Australian art teachers